Romance is a 1920 American silent drama film directed by Chester Withey and released through United Artists. The film is based on the 1913 play Romance by Edward Sheldon and stars Doris Keane, the actress who created the role in the play. This was Miss Keane's only motion picture. D. W. Griffith allowed the use of his Mamaroneck Studios for the production. The nephew of Griffith's favorite cameraman, Billy Bitzer,  was the cinematographer. The story was later remade as Romance in 1930, an early talking vehicle for Greta Garbo.

No copies of Romance are known to survive making it a lost film.

Plot
As described in a film publication, a youth (Arthur Rankin) in the prologue seeks advice from his grandfather (Sydney), who then recalls a romance of his own youth which is then shown as a flashback. A priest (Sydney) is in love with an Italian opera singer (Keane), and the drama involves the conflict between his efforts to rise above worldly things or to leave with her. The romance ends with a deep note of pathos.

Cast

Production
The movie was based on a hit play and was financed by fledgling United Artists. $150,000 was spent on the story and Doris Keane's salary. It went $100,000 over budget and recorded a loss of $80,000.

References

External links

 
 Romance synopsis; allmovie.com
 

1920 films
American silent feature films
Films directed by Chester Withey
Lost American films
American films based on plays
Films based on works by Edward Sheldon
American black-and-white films
Silent American drama films
1920 drama films
1920 lost films
Lost drama films
1920s American films